Newtown is a town in County Tipperary, Ireland. As of the 2016 census, the population was 309. It is in the barony of Owney and Arra. It is also part of the parish of Youghalarra in the Roman Catholic Diocese of Killaloe.

Geography 

Newtown's climate is Oceanic (Cfb). The village lies in the base of the Arra Mountains. The Newtown River rises near Tountinna and flows past the town and into Youghal Bay. The town is split between Pallas Beg and Monroe townlands. There are three housing estates in Newtown and the Arra Rovers FC is based here. There are two pubs and a post office.

Places of note

 Newtown Watermill is a watermill around 320m away from the main road.

 Church of the Holy Spirit is Newtown's main church with large stained glass windows.

 Youghal Quay is a small harbour to dock boats in Youghal.

 St Conlons Well is a holy well in Youghal near a small pond.

Sport
Burgess GAA is the local Gaelic Athletic Association club.

External links
 Youghalarra National School

See also
List of towns and villages in Ireland

References

Towns and villages in County Tipperary